Spy × Family, a manga series written and illustrated by Tatsuya Endo, features a cast of characters who live in an alternate fictional version of the real world. The story is set in two neighboring countries: Westalis and Ostania. The two countries just recently established peace after a long period of devastating war. Despite the effort of maintaining the amity, there has been sparkles to ignite the war once again.

The plot follows the Forger family, which consists of Loid, Yor, Anya and Bond Forger. They are a "pretend family" who stay together in unconventional circumstances for their ulterior motives and secrets. Loid Forger, whose real identity is the Westalian master spy "Twilight", adopts an orphan telepathic girl named Anya, and marries an Ostanian professional assassin Yor Briar; later, they adopt Bond, a precognitive dog, into their care. The Forger family members, for the most part, are not aware of others' secrets, but they accept the falsehood of their union and willingly and genuinely love and care for each other. The supporting cast includes their friends, relatives, colleagues, allies and enemies, who help push the plot forwards. Although most of the story and the characters live in Ostania, Westalis and the fragile relationship between the two countries are always the focal point, serving as the driving force of the main characters' objectives and purposes.

Forger family
 
 
 Played by: Win Morisaki and Hiroki Suzuki (adult), Eima Saitō and Kichinosuke Yonemoto (young) (Japanese musical adaptation)
 An unnamed spy from Westalis with extraordinary combat, memory, and information processing capabilities. As a master of disguise, he uses various faces and names for each mission, though he is generally known by his code name "Twilight." His most recent mission, Operation Strix, requires him to enroll a child in the prestigious Eden Academy to approach a prominent figure in Ostania's warmonger political party, Donovan Desmond. He subsequently camouflages himself as "Loid Forger," a psychiatrist at Berlint General Hospital, to create a false family by adopting Anya and marrying Yor, although he is ignorant of their hidden talents. Loid possesses a vast amount of talents and skills in espionage and in real life. Although he appears to be manipulative and pragmatic when accomplishing his missions, he slowly reveals his soft side to his family and as time passes, he grows to care for them genuinely, although he outwardly does not admit it.
 As revealed later in the story, Twilight used to live with his parents in Luwen, Westalis, a town close to the Ostanian border. He lost both of his parents and his close friends when the war started. He enlisted under a fake name and met Franky Franklin, who was a runaway Ostanian soldier. After being recruited by Westalian Intelligence Agency and discarding his identity, he was trained under Sylvia Sherwood by her harsh and rigorous methods which have traumatized him until this day. He later became the spy Twilight who aimed to create a "world where children don't need to cry." At some point during his espionage career, he trained Nightfall and instilled her perfectionist and emotionless personalities in her, which have lasted until the present.
 
 
 Played by: Risa Masuda, Aoi Ikemuda, Miharu Izawa and Miharu Fukuchi (Japanese musical adaptation)
 A young girl who can read minds, Anya is the only one who knows the overall situation of her family but conceals her talents and her awareness, both out of excitement over Loid's and Yor's jobs and for fear of abandonment. She claimed to be six when she read Loid’s mind and learned that he needed a six-year-old for his mission, and although she appears to be around age four or five; her true age is currently unknown. She was originally an experimental human test subject dubbed . The only confirmed details of her past is her name "Anya" and that she had been adopted by several families, only to be returned to the orphanage each time. Although she displays a great control in her mind reading power, Anya cannot use it during a new moon. Moreover, she often gets nauseous or a nosebleed when she has to listen to a lot of people's minds at the same time thus she tends to avoid crowded places.
 Because Anya has not received a proper education and had been forced to study repeatedly when she was a test subject, she is not good at studying and usually refuses to do so. She relies on her ability to read others' minds for test answers. Thanks to Yuri and housemaster Henderson, she realizes the importance of education and is willingly to study and improve herself. She also appears to be talented in Classic Literature. Anya's favorite food is peanuts, she likes the spy-themed cartoon Spy Wars, and thinks anything involving "secrets" and "missions" is exciting. She is quite flexible and quick-witted for a child her age, and from time to time she is able to trick Loid, an extremely observant spy. She also displays her bravery from time to time, such as saving a drowning child, standing up for her friends and alerting Loid of the bomb trap despite the danger, which has earned her two Stellas at the academy so far.
 Knowing about Loid's mission, Anya is always trying to help him, especially with his scheme to make friends with the Desmonds through Damian Desmond. Because of an altercation with Damian during orientation day, she has been shunned by the whole class, but has found a friendship in Becky Blackbell. She is unaware of Damian's feeling toward her and does not have a favorable impression of him, but still tries to make friends with Damian for Loid's mission.
 
 
 Played by: Fūka Yuzuki and Mirei Sasaki (Japanese musical adaptation)
 A 27-year-old professional assassin nicknamed "Thorn Princess", who has a day job as an employee at Berlint City Hall. She agrees to a fake marriage without knowing Loid's true background, as unmarried young women are suspected of being spies. She believes Loid's lie that Anya is Loid's biological daughter from a previous marriage. Yor is extremely strong and tough, as she can kick a speeding car to the curb, dice a tennis ball with a racket, survive bullet wounds, slice through a cutting board, and withstand lethal poisons. Her weapons of choice are needle-like stilettos; they are long, have no guard, and have a ring pommel. Yor is also an expert in hand-to-hand combat, being able to paralyze targets with her pressure point technique, stab through the human body with her spear-hand technique and give Loid a difficult time when they spar.. Yor is good at cleaning due to the nature of her assassination work, but she is not good with other household chores, particularly cooking. Her homemade meals are bad to the point of being poisonous, and while she strives to improve, Loid has to do most of the work in the kitchen. Despite being seemingly immune to poison and her own cooking, she gets drunk easily with a small amount of alcohol. 
 In her assassinations or when she is serious, Yor is ferocious and intimidating to the point of a bestial appearance. But in her everyday life, Yor is soft, caring, formally spoken and considerate to others. She is selfless and always ready to help others, no matter what the situation or who the other person is. She is sometimes an airhead and absent-minded, and occasionally does not realize to control her inhuman power. Because of this, as well as her lack of communication and social skills, she has difficulties adjusting to the norm and thus is a frequent target of her coworker's bullying. Yor strives to be a good wife and mother for the Forgers and the thought of lacking that quality makes her insecure.
 Like Loid, Yor lost her parents early. She raised her younger brother Yuri by herself, and became an assassin at a young age to earn a living for the both of them. She has been working for the secretive and infamous assassin group Garden up until recently, and considered quitting at one point. Neither she nor her brother are aware of each other's secret jobs. Recently, she met Melinda Desmond, Loid's target's wife, and was invited to join her circle of friends, "The Lady Patriot Society".
 
 
 The family's pet Great Pyrenees, Bond was originally Project Apple's canine test subject named . He can glimpse the future, a fact which is known and utilized only by Anya through her telepathy. He meets Anya and the Forger family when he was used in a terrorist bomb attack. Thanks to his ability he made contact and protected Anya, unknowingly saving Loid's life. He later was adopted by the Forgers and was named Bond by Anya, after Anya's favorite cartoon character in Spy Wars, Bondman.
 He displays unconditional love and loyalty to the Forgers, and is especially close to Anya. Thus, he displays jealousy when Anya shows affection toward others, even if it is a toy. He is resistant and hesitant to any form of training because of his past in Project Apple. Bond is sometimes quite absent-minded and easily distracted. Despite his flaws, he is a smart and strong dog, and is capable of understanding his owners' instructions, recognizing dangers and taking down adult humans. Bond dreads Yor's cooking after his future sight once showed him that it could kill him, and goes to great lengths to avoid it. He also formed a bond with Franky over the times Franky has had to take care of him.

Eden Academy
, or alternatively named , is a highly prestigious private school located in Berlint, Ostania. The academy provides top-class education for a student body of approximately 2500 students, from age 6 to 19, covers from academic subjects, to sports and fine arts. The admission process is notoriously harsh, which has 2 rounds: the writing exam and the formal family interview. Once enrolled, students are put into one of eight houses and they have the choice to stay in expensive house dormitories or commute. A student who obtains eight Stella Stars becomes a member of Eden Academy's elite students called , while those punished with eight Tonitrus Bolts are automatically expelled.

Students

A classmate of Anya and the son of Donovan Desmond. Loid aims to approach his father through him and has been pushing Anya into becoming friends with Damian. Since his father has an overwhelming authority, Damian works hard to gain his father's attention and approval. He is diligent in his studies, and excels in History, which is showed when he earns a Stella Star in the History midterm exam by placing 2nd in his grade. He was formerly hostile and arrogant toward Anya but has gradually changed and developed feelings for her as a result of various misunderstandings during their encounters. He has an Imperial Scholar older brother named Demetrius Desmond and a German Shepherd dog named . He stays in the dormitories of Cecil Hall at school with his two closest friends, Emile and Ewen.

Anya's best friend at school, and a Cecil Hall's first grader. Her father is the CEO of Blackbell Heavy Industries, a major military manufacturer and is always doting on her, giving her anything she wishes. She is usually seen in the care of her butler, Martha. She also has a Yorkshire Terrier dog, named . After Anya's altercation with Damian on the first day of school in defense of Becky, she becomes Anya's friend. She has been treating her with great care, although every other classmate has shunned both of them. She has a crush on Loid, her friend's dad, and has been trying to get his attention unsuccessfully. Although she see Yor as a rival, she admires Yor for her strength.

Damian's classmate. He is carefree, laidback and loves sweet food. He, Damian and Ewen are always seen together, and they are placed in the same dormitory, Cecil Hall. He and Ewen at first appeared to be Damian's underlings but later they started treating each other as equals and have been staying together through the hardships at the Eden Academy. He and Ewen are not aware of Damian's feelings toward Anya and still pick on her every time they collide.

Damian's classmate. He seems to be brighter and more observant than he appears and dreams to become an astronaut in the future. He, Damian, and Emile are always seen together, and they are placed in the same dormitory, Cecil Hall. He and Emile at first appeared to be Damian's underlings but later they started treating each other as equals and have been staying together through the hardships at the Eden Academy. He and Emile are not aware of Damian's feelings toward Anya and still pick on her every time they collide.

The son of the CEO of Glooman Pharmaceuticals, and a first grader in Cecil Hall. Believing his family business was driven into bankruptcy by the Desmond Group and he would have to drop out as a result, he schemed to get Damian expelled, going as far as hiring the amateur spy Daybreak to fix Damian's exam answer sheet. The class took pity on him and bid him farewell on his last day. When the misunderstanding was cleared, he was still able to go to school the next day and has been ostracized by the entire class since.

A first grader in Wald Hall and the son of a Major in the Ostanian Army. Nicknamed  for not only his extremely stout physique but also his perceptive intellect, he has been dominating all of the sport tournaments since nursery school. Despite his strong mentality, he is prone to crying when facing failure and hardship like normal kids. He is well-liked by his classmates, and treats his peers considerately.

Staff

Played by: Sōma Suzuki (Japanese musical adaptation)
A 65-year-old history teacher and the housemaster of dormitory 3, Cecil Hall at Eden Academy. He used to hold a high position in the Academy but was demoted to teaching first-grade students after attacking fellow housemaster Swan in defense of the Forger family. He is also the homeroom teacher of Anya and her friends and oversees the dormitory where Damian and his friends reside. He emphasizes "elegance" and hold his students and himself to a high standard. He seems to not be bothered by the demotion, intending to use the opportunity to educate and discipline the children to his standard.

A 47-year-old economics teacher and also the Housemaster of dormitory 2, Cline Hall. He is the only son of the former Headmaster of Eden Academy and was hired because of nepotism. He is callous, arrogant and generally uncouth, primarily due to his wife divorcing him and taking full custody of their daughter. After sabotaging the Forger family's interview with his underhanded questions, an enraged Henderson incapacitated him in defense of the Forger family.

A 59-year-old native language teacher and also the Housemaster of dormitory 5, Malcom Hall. He is gentle, reliable and loved by his students.

An extremely rigorous school teacher, who is a member of Eden Academy's disciplinary committee. She has a habit of giving Tonitrus Bolts to students, even for minor and unreasonable infractions, under the claim that even minor mistakes must be avoided at any cost for the sake of their future. The students are understandably scared of her, spreading along the rumor that she has expelled over 100 students.

Current headmaster of Eden Academy. According to some facility members, he does not accept bribes from parents to fix the grades. His school policies are the reason for the increase in difficulty of the school's study materials and exams.
 
A 55-year-old Tutor in Residence of Cecil Hall.

WISE
The  is the Westalian spy agency Twilight works for, whose main objective is to counter any initiatives within Ostania that may threaten the peace between both countries.

Played by: Manato Asaka (Japanese musical adaptation)
Twilight's handler and main contact at WISE, who gives him most of his missions and oversees Operation Strix. She works as an attaché and secretary in the embassy as a front for her intelligence act. She is called  by her agents due to her exceptional abilities and personality. She tends to give her agents a hard time and overworks them, especially Twilight, whom she directly trained when he joined the espionage work. Her training was apparently harsh and traumatic for Twilight, which he still remembers until this day. Sylvia is extremely competent and reliable, being able to trick SSS agents and apprehend terrorists by herself; although she admits that overexerting takes a toil on her body. She once had a young daughter, but what happened to her is unknown.

Played by: Nonoka Yamaguchi (Japanese musical adaptation)
An intelligence agent code-named "Nightfall", Twilight's espionage partner and coworker at Berlint General Hospital, where she works as an undercover clerk. She was trained by Twilight and has been following his teachings to an extreme ever since. Possessing an athletic physique and a cunning mind, she is shown to be a capable and proficient spy. Taking in Twilight's words, she hides all of her emotions and appears to be emotionless, making people see her as a ruthless opportunist, readily resorting to do anything to achieve her goal. In reality, she harbors strong feelings for Twilight and is prepared to do anything to appeal to him but she keeps most of her intentions and emotions deep down, as Twilight once taught her. She believes Yor is unworthy and wishes to replace her as Twilight's wife in Operation Strix. Only Anya is aware of her true nature and is wary of her because of her Spartan method of training children.
WISE Director

The director of WISE who is also in charge of Operation Strix. He has a lackadaisical attitude toward Operation Strix, having great faith that Twilight is able to pull anything off.
WISE Attendant

An veteran agent who seems to be a close associate and assistant to Sylvia. He sometimes appears on the field to assist Loid and Sylvia in big missions, getting himself in dangerous and life-threatening situations in the process. He is experienced in espionage tactics and is able to discern unreliable and false information. He also displays his empathy with the late Ostanian Colonel Erik Zacharis for his hidden starlet photo collection.
WISE Rookie

An inexperienced agent who works under the tutelage of Sylvia. He is easy to be swayed by false information and his own emotions, which leads to incorrect assessment of the situation sometimes.

State Security Service
Their main objectives are counter-intelligence activities, including surveilling the public and hunting spies. They resort to any tactic no matter how extreme to get information, including kidnapping, interrogation, torture, wiretapping, etc.

 
 
 Played by: Kurumu Okamiya and Tsubasa Takizawa (Japanese musical adaptation)
 Yor's 20-year-old younger brother. Ostensibly an official at the Ministry of Foreign Affairs, this is cover for his actual position as a lieutenant of the State Security Service - where he is tasked with hunting down "Twilight" and other rebels, terrorists, and overseas intelligence groups. He is exemplary at his job and knows how to use violence as a tool to get his work done, showing no mercy to criminals. However, he still has empathy and compassion for others. He is a bit too attached to his sister, opposing Yor and Loid's marriage and has an antagonistic view toward Loid and Anya, while knowing neither Yor's actual assassin job nor Loid's true identity. Both Loid and Anya know about his actual occupation as secret police while Yor remains oblivious. He has a sturdy physique, being able to withstand heavy injuries and consume poisonous food, thanks to his childhood under Yor's care. Despite his resilience, his overworking tendency sometimes gets the best of him, leaving him bedridden quite a few times.
 
 
 Yuri's higher-command colleague. He has two scars over his left eye. While he is a stoic and serious person, he seems to care for Yuri and views him like a close friend. He knows about Yuri's obsession with his sister, his overworking tendencies and his drinking problem and advises him accordingly. He also took care of Yuri by bringing him food and herbal medicine when he is sick.
 
 
 Yuri's boss. He is a cheerful man who is fond of Yuri, comparing him to a "cute puppy". Apparently thanks to him, Yuri was recruited into the SSS and subsequently rose quickly in the ranks.

Garden
 is the notorious Ostanian assassin organization which Yor works for. They operate under the direction from a shadow government to purge the traitors of the country. The group also has connections to the underground mafia, including the former Gretcher family. Many people consider them to be urban legends. It is said that only one of their operatives is enough to wipe out an entire military troop.

The leader of Garden, the assassin group where Yor is currently employed, working at a tailor shop as a front. The Shopkeeper contacts and provides Yor with photos of the target, as well as information about their capabilities and defenses. The targets are usually deemed to be traitors to the nation of Ostania or those who seek to disturb the current peace.

One of Garden's affiliates who works as the Director of Policy at Berlint City Hall. He keeps an eye on Yor and supports her in her missions. Although he is apparently not as superhumanly strong as Yor, he is exceptionally competent, being able to dispatch weak assassins sent after them or handle multiple types of gun efficiently. He is aware of Yor's wavering determination and conflicted emotions during a given mission.

Desmond family

The President of the National Unity Party, former Prime Minister of Ostania and the primary target of Operation Strix. He is married to Melinda and the father of Demetrius and Damian. He rarely appears in the public and always stays in the shadow of his own operations. His only appearance is at an annual party held for the Eden Academy's Imperial Scholars, which his son Demetrius is a part of. He emphasizes achievement and emotionally neglects his children. As WISE reported, his political party, which supports the instigation of another war against Westalis, lost power and recently have resorted to smaller events and incidents prompting unrest among the citizens.

Donovan's wife, the former First Lady of Ostania and Demetrius and Damian's mother. She meets Yor by chance and quickly befriends her, inviting Yor to her group of friends, "The Lady Patriot Society", consisting of mothers from affluent families who live in Berlint. Like her husband, she is distant and estranged from her family. Taking a "hand-off parenting" method, she limits communication with her sons. She also keeps her circle close and intimate and rarely involves herself in politics since her family's political party lost power. During their first encounter, Anya discovered that she has a kind of dissociative identity disorder, which manifests in her feelings toward her sons quickly alternating between motherly love and total disregard for their wellbeing.

The first son of Donovan and Melinda Desmond. He attends Eden Academy and is a part of the Imperial Scholars group due to various academic achievements. He is said to be an exceptional student and an overachiever, as Loid noted that he only made a single mistake in his midterm exams. He rarely converses with his brother and seems to be distant to the rest of his family like their parents.

Supporting characters

Played by: Kento Kinouchi (Japanese musical adaptation)
 An informant who provides information to Twilight and a longtime friend of the spy; he first met Twilight during the last war between Westalis and Ostania, as soldiers from opposite sides of the battlefield. He is iaware of Twilight's mission, the Forger family's situation and frequently acts as a caretaker for Anya and Bond. He works as a tobacconist during the day and an inventor in his free time. He is notably hopeless in his romantic pursuits. Anya calls him  and he seems to be fond of that name, sometimes using it as his alias in his informant jobs. 

One of three co-workers of Yor at City Hall. Dominic's girlfriend. A two-faced woman at first, she slowly warms up to Yor over the course of the story, to the point of teaching her on how to cook. Camilla is an excellent cook as she is able to figure out the Briar soup recipe by simply hearing the story of how Yor made it.

One of three co-workers of Yor at City Hall. A blunt girl, and the youngest of the three. She is primarily used as a running gag because of her desire to report her boss to the Secret Police, due to him ogling her. She broke up with her boyfriend sometime at the beginning of the story.

One of three co-workers of Yor at City Hall. A snide woman at first, Sharon becomes supportive of Yor over the course of the story. The oldest of the three, she is married and has a child who is taking Eden Academy's entrance exam at the beginning of the story.

Camilla's beau and Yuri's co-worker at the Ministry of Foreign Affairs. He lives next door to Yuri and is unaware of Yuri's real job. He is very supportive of Yor through her endeavors, and also provides Yuri information about his sister occasionally.

The butler of the Blackbell family and the primary caretaker of Becky Blackbell. She cares for and loves Becky genuinely, correcting her haughtiness and bad manners. She is usually seen as Becky's chauffeur. Loid observes that Martha might be an experienced veteran. Despite her age, Martha is able to execute difficult acrobatic movements and shoot a stun gun midair while rescuing Anya. She and Henry seem to know each other well.

Other characters

Bondman is a master spy and the main character of the in-universe fictional comic and cartoon series  that is Anya's favorite series. He is always seen with his trademarked yellow hat and coat, and black mask, gloves and shoes. Bond Forger was named after him when Anya saw their similarities. He regularly fights against the League of Evil and rescue . He is also a womanizer, seducing a lot of women throughout his career, including his enemies, allies, and bystanders. He refuses to turn down any of his romance conquests, even while facing the anger and violent treatment of the rest of his girlfriends.

 
The leader of an extremist terrorist group, consisting of Berlint University students. He and his group planned to ignite the war between two countries by assassinating the visiting Westalian Minister Brantz with bomb-carrying dogs. He is shown to be cruel and heartless, ordering his underling to kill Anya when she discovered his plan and willingly sacrificing innocent lives in his bomb attack. He is also very intelligent, able to make an explosive trap that would have taken Loid Forger's life without Anya and Bond's intervention. He was intercepted by WISE agents and later arrested.

A self-employed Ostanian spy. He believes himself the rival of the renowned spy Twilight and names himself accordingly. He was hired by George Glooman to sabotage the Desmond brothers' exam sheets. He is vastly unprepared and careless, and consequently, unsuitable for espionage, although he seems to possess a great amount of luck.

The usurper of the Gretcher family's mafia organization. He eliminated all of the Gretchers, except Olka Gretcher and her son, and took power in their stead. He ordered assassins to chase after Olka when she planned her escape on the Princess Lorelei cruise. He is now conspiring with Ostanian pro-war extremists to get rich through arms dealing.

The last remaining of the Gretcher family, along with her son , after her family was wiped out. Her family used to run a black market, and also used the profit to feed the less fortunate during the war. After her family's annihilation, she changed her appearance and planned to escape to another country on the Princess Lorelei cruise ship. Thanks to the Garden's help, she was put under the protection of Yor and Matthew. She, her son, and her friend,  were able to escape safely after a bloody confrontation with the assassins sent by Leonardo Hapoon.

Reception
Antonio Mireles of The Fandom Post enjoyed the comedy of the title dysfunctional family as well as their personalities. He described the family setup of Loid as the straight man, Yor the "dumb character" and Anya the adorable child "that readers fall in love with," as the perfect recipe for a comedy. However, he felt the humor that comes from Yor being the dumb character was underutilized. As a result, Anime News Network felt that following chapters focused on Yor made her character more enjoyable. Comic Book Resources called the artist's range of facial expressions his" secret weapon" to attract readers, most notably Anya, whom Collins said, "steals every page she appears on." In a review for Polygon, Julia Lee agreed, focusing on the expressive panels that really show the audience the characters are feeling. In a further analysis,  Den of Geek finds the Forgers' secrets as another reason for the series' popularity while also highlighting how despite Loid being a competent spy, his mission of becoming a good father is also hilarious.

Anime Feminist also noted that the series' popularity is owed to the artwork, most notably Anya's multiple facial expressions and felt that the first episode was appealing thanks to the bond Loid and Anya form when the former adopts the latter, giving potential for Yor's debut. Morgana Santilli of The Beat enjoyed the chemistry between the arranged family as he notes Anya makes the trio stand out. IGN also enjoyed Anya to the point she could be one of the best characters from 2022, labelling here as the "adorable child character that steals every scene they are in, who will inspire a ludicrous amount of merch" while also addressing how her powers are also a symbolism of how receptive children can be. IGN also praised Yor due to how strong she can be despite early signs of a clumsy woman.

Anya's popularity led to Toho make a music video heavily featuring her. Additionally, a Tamagotchi involving Anya was released in June 2022. In a survey conducted by FinT, Spy × Family and Anya were ranked no. 1 and no. 4 respectively on the top trending things among Generation Z in Japan for 2022. In the same survey,  was the no. 1 trending phrase of the year in part due to music remixes on TikTok.

Notes

References

Spy × Family manga
Entire series
 Spy × Family manga volumes by Endo, Tatsuya. Original Japanese version published by Shueisha. English translation published by Viz Media.

Individual volumes

Other sources

Spy x Family
Spy × Family